The 1964 Scotch Cup was the sixth edition of the Scotch Cup with the tournament being held outside of Scotland for the first time with Calgary, Canada hosting the tournament at the Stampede Corral from March 16–19, 1964.

The tournament was expanded to six teams with Norway and Switzerland debuting in the tournament. This meant a playoff system had to be introduced with the top four teams competing in a knockout format. The final saw Canada claim their sixth title defeating Scotland 12-10 in an extra 13th end. In the extra, with the game tied 10–10, with Canada having hammer, Scottish skip Alex F. Torrance was heavy with his final draw against two Canadian rocks, and Canada skip Lyall Dagg didn't have to throw his last rock. 

The attendance for the week was 20,242, a record for the time, and included an attendance of 4,370 for the final.

Teams 

*Throws third rocks.

Standings

Results

Draw 1 
March 16, 8:00pm

Draw 2 
March 17, 2:30pm

Draw 3 
March 17, 8:00pm

Draw 4 
March 18, 2:30pm

Draw 5 
March 18, 8:00pm

Playoffs

Semifinals 
March 19, 2:30pm

Final 
March 19, 8:00pm

References

External links 

World Men's Curling Championship
Scotch Cup
Curling competitions in Calgary
International curling competitions hosted by Canada
1960s in Calgary
Scotch Cup
Scotch Cup